Carmen de Bolívar Airport, also called Montemariano Airport  is an airport serving the town of El Carmen de Bolívar and the Montes de Maria subregion, in the Bolívar Department of Colombia.

See also

Transport in Colombia
List of airports in Colombia

References

External links
OpenStreetMap - El Carmen de Bolívar
OurAirports - El Carmen de Bolívar
FallingRain - El Carmen de Bolívar

Airports in Colombia